Robert Roy Hazelwood (March 4, 1938 – April 18, 2016) was a former FBI profiler of sex crimes and is generally regarded as the pioneer of profiling sexual predators. He worked for much of his career for the FBI, retiring in the mid-1990s.

Early life
Roy Hazelwood was born in Pocatello, Idaho.  His parents were Elmo Earl (step-father) and Louella Matilda (Schaible) Hazelwood. He had three siblings: half-brothers James Martin (Jim) and Gene Hazelwood, as well as half-sister Earlene Daniels. When he was an infant, his biological father, Myrle Reddick, kidnapped him and travelled around with him for six months before returning the boy to his paternal grandparents; father and son never saw each other again. He was raised by his mother and stepfather in Spring Branch, Houston, Texas, and attended Sam Houston State University.

He joined the U.S. Army and served a tour in the Vietnam War in the military police, which he completed in 1968. He left the military after 11 years with rank of Major. He followed his tour with a forensic medicine fellowship with the Armed Forces Institute of Pathology (AFIP) and a stint with the CID as an instructor.

He joined the FBI in 1971.

Career
In 1980, he developed the distinction between "organized" and "disorganized" murderers, a concept that is still used by law enforcement to help in the apprehension of criminals. He also defined the six categories of rapists: power-reassurance, power assertive, anger retaliatory, anger excitation, opportunistic and gang. Of the six, anger excitation is by far the most dangerous and the hardest to capture.

Hazelwood also offered the theory that there is no cure for pedophilia or sexual sadists. He has conducted numerous studies involving sex crimes, including cases of erotic asphyxiation. He did numerous studies involving the willing victims of sexual sadists (wives and girlfriends) and how sexual sadists appear in everyday life. In his career he found equivocal death crime as the most dubious and complex investigation to overcome.

Hazelwood, after he retired from the FBI, was an active member of the Academy Group, an organization of former FBI agents and law enforcement officers. He continued to work closely with the FBI and other government agencies in an effort to track down sexually-oriented murderers. Hazelwood also co-authored two books with Stephen Michaud: The Evil That Men Do and Dark Dreams.

Hazelwood also gave lectures across North America about sexual sadism and autoerotic fatalities. His presentation was also heavily focused on Dennis Rader, the "B.T.K." serial killer of Wichita.

A fully endowed scholarship in memory of Roy Hazelwood is available for the Master's Degree in Criminal Justice Studies (Applied Criminology Concentration) at California University of Pennsylvania.

Personal life
Hazelwood was a devout Presbyterian. According to Legacy.com, he died peacefully while taking a nap in the sun at his home on April 18, 2016.  He was buried with appropriate honors at Quantico National Cemetery. He is survived by a wife and three grown children.

References

1938 births
2016 deaths
American non-fiction crime writers
Baptists from Idaho
Federal Bureau of Investigation agents
Offender profiling
People from Pocatello, Idaho
American Presbyterians
United States Army officers
Burials at Quantico National Cemetery
20th-century Baptists
Sam Houston State University alumni